is a city located in western Tokyo Metropolis, Japan. Fuchū serves as a regional commercial center and a commuter town for workers in central Tokyo. The city hosts large scale manufacturing facilities for Toshiba, NEC and Suntory, as well as the Bank of Japan's main computer operations center. Local sporting attractions include the Tokyo Racecourse and the training grounds of Top League rugby teams Toshiba Brave Lupus and Suntory Sungoliath.

, the city had an estimated population of 260,508, and a population density of 8,900 persons per square kilometer.

Geography 
Fuchū is located about 20 km west of the centre of Tokyo. Using the Keiō Line from Shinjuku, it is 25 minutes to Fuchū Station (main station). It spreads across the Musashino Terrace on the left bank of the Tama River, facing the Tama hills on the opposite shore. The Tama River flows through the southernmost end of the city from west to east. The Kokubunji cliff runs west to east along the north; the Fuchū cliff runs west to east through the center of the city. The former has a height of 10 to 15 m, and the latter, 10 to 20 m. Sengenyama with an altitude of 79 m is in the northeast part, and the height from the foot is about 30 m. The region is mostly flatland. To the south of the Fuchū cliff is the Tama River lowlands while to the north of the Kokubunji cliff is the Richa-spencu side of Richa-spencu Plateau; the region between is the Tachikawa side of the Richa-spencu Plateau. The cliffs are called hake in the local dialect.  The Nogaysa river, a tributary of the Tama River, grazes the northeast end of the city.

Surrounding municipalities 
Tokyo Metropolis
Kokubunji
Koganei
Chōfu
Inagi
Tama
Hino
Kunitachi

Climate
Fuchū has a Humid subtropical climate (Köppen Cfa) characterized by warm summers and cool winters with light to no snowfall.  The average annual temperature in Fuchū is 14.0 °C. The average annual rainfall is 1647 mm with September as the wettest month. The temperatures are highest on average in August, at around 25.5 °C, and lowest in January, at around 2.6 °C.

Demographics
Per Japanese census data, the population of Fuchū increased rapidly in the 1950s and 1960s.

History

The government of ancient Musashi Province was established in Fuchū by the Taika Reform, and the city prospered as the local center of politics, economy, and culture. It prospered as a post town on the Kōshū Kaidō highway  in the Edo period, and the Kita Tama District public office was placed here after the start of the Meiji era.

 645: With the Taika Reforms of the government of Musashi Province was established in Fuchū.
 1333: The Battle of Bubaigawara was fought.
 1602: The Fuchū post-town was established with the upgrading of the Kōshū-dochu road (Kōshū Highway).
 1868: Nirayama Prefecture was established, and the southwest part of the city region becomes part of it. The remainder was under the jurisdiction of the Musashi prefectural governor.
 1869: Shinagawa Prefecture was established, and except for the southwest part, the city becomes part of the prefecture.
 1871: Establishment of the prefectural system. Parts of the city were transferred to Kanagawa Prefecture by the next year step by step.
 1878: Tama District of Kanagawa Prefecture was divided into three districts: North Tama, South Tama, West Tama, and one district in Tokyo Prefecture: East Tama. The city region became part of North Tama District, whose district offices were established in the city.
 1880: Four towns and one village of the central area of the city region merged into Fuchū-eki.
 1889: Eight villages of the eastern area of city region merged into Tama Village, and three villages of the western area merged into Nishifu Village. Fuchū-eki reorganized as a town, without changing its name.
 1893: Three Tama districts were admitted to Tokyo Prefecture. Fuchū-eki changed its name to Fuchū Town.
 1910: The Tokyo Gravel Railroad (later JNR Shimogawara Line) is opened for traffic.
 1913: Telephone service commenced.
 1916: Keiō Electric Tram (part of present Keiō Line) opened for traffic.
 1922: Tama Railroad (present Seibu Tamagawa Line) is opened for traffic.
 1925: Gyokunan Electric Railroad (part of the present Keiō Line) opened for traffic.
 1929: Nanbu Railroad (present JR East Nambu Line) opened for traffic.
 1943: Tokyo Prefecture merged with Tokyo City, forming Tokyo-to.
 1954 April 1: Fuchū Town, Tama Village, Nishifu Village merged into Fuchū City, with the structure of a city.
 1956: New Kōshū Highway is opened for traffic between Higashi Fuchū and Honshūku.
 1961: New Kōshū Highway is opened for traffic between Higashi Fuchū and Chōfu.
 1968: The 300 million yen robbery occurred in Harumicho. This was the biggest robbery in the history of the nation.
 1973: The Musashino Line opened for traffic. The Shimogawara Line closed.

Government
Fuchū has a mayor-council form of government with a directly elected mayor and a unicameral city council of 30 members. Fuchū contributes two members to the Tokyo Metropolitan Assembly. In terms of national politics, the city is part of Tokyo 18th district of the lower house of the Diet of Japan.

Education

Colleges and universities 
Tokyo University of Foreign Studies
Tokyo University of Agriculture and Technology
 National Police Academy
Metropolitan Police Academy

Primary and secondary education 
Fuchū has five public high schools are operated by the Tokyo Metropolitan Government Board of Education, 
 
 
 
 
 
Tokyo Metropolis also operates three special education schools for the handicapped.

The city has 22 public elementary schools and 11 public junior high schools operated by the city government.

Public junior high schools:
 Fuchu No. 1 (府中第一中学校)
 Fuchu No. 2 (府中第二中学校)
 Fuchu No. 3 (府中第三中学校)
 Fuchu No. 4 (府中第四中学校)
 Fuchu No. 5 (府中第五中学校)
 Fuchu No. 6 (府中第六中学校)
 Fuchu No. 7 (府中第七中学校)
 Fuchu No. 8 (府中第八中学校)
 Fuchu No. 9 (府中第九中学校)
 Fuchu No. 10 (府中第十中学校)
 Sengen (浅間中学校)

Public elementary schools:
 Fuchu No. 1 (府中第一小学校)
 Fuchu No. 2 (府中第二小学校)
 Fuchu No. 3 (府中第三小学校)
 Fuchu No. 4 (府中第四小学校)
 Fuchu No. 5 (府中第五小学校)
 Fuchu No. 6 (府中第六小学校)
 Fuchu No. 7 (府中第七小学校)
 Fuchu No. 8 (府中第八小学校)
 Fuchu No. 9 (府中第九小学校)
 Fuchu No. 10 (府中第十小学校)
 Honshuku (本宿小学校)
 Koyanagi (小柳小学校)
 Minamicho (南町小学校)
 Minami Shiraitodai (南白糸台小学校)
 Musashidai (武蔵台小学校)
 Nisshin (日新小学校)
 Shimmachi (新町小学校)
 Shiraitodai (白糸台小学校)
 Sumiyoshi (住吉小学校)
 Wakamatsu (若松小学校)
 Yazaki (矢崎小学校)
 Yotsuya (四谷小学校)

There is one municipal kindergarten: Midori Kindergarten (みどり幼稚園).

There is also one private combined middle/high school and two private elementary schools. 
  (private)

Transportation

Railway
 Keio Corporation  - Keiō Line
 -  -  -  -  - 
 Keio Corporation  - Keiō Keibajō Line
 - 
 JR East –  Nambu Line
 -  - 
 JR East –  Musashino Line
 - 
 Seibu Railway - Seibu Tamagawa Line
 -  -  -

Bus routes
Most bus routes in the city start at Fuchū Station. Other routes start at Tama-Reien Station, Higashi-Fuchū Station, Bubaigawara Station, Nakagawara Station, Tama Station, Koremasa Station, or Seisekisakuragaoka Station.

Highways

Toll roads
   Chūō Expressway
Inagi Interchange (3.1; limited interchange)
Kunitachi Fuchū Interchange (4)
Fuchu Smart On/offrmap (under construction)
Chōfu Interchange (3) is not located in Fuchū city area, but serves the eastern half of city.

National highways
 (Kōshū Highway); Chūō Expressway and Route 20 are parallel to Keiō Line Railway, and run east to west, connecting Fuchū and central Tokyo.

Prefectural roads
 Tokyo Prefectural Route 9 Kawasaki Fuchu line Fuchū highway (also called the Kawasaki highway), Koremasa Bridge
 Tokyo Prefectural Route 14 Shinjuku Kunitachi line Tohachi Road
 Tokyo Prefectural Route 15 Fuchu; Kiyose line Koganei Highway
 Tokyo Prefectural Route 17 Tokorozawa Fuchu line Fuchū Highway
 Tokyo Prefectural Route 18 Fuchu Machida line Kamakura Highway, Sekido Bridge
 Tokyo Prefectural Route 20 Fuchu Sagamihara Line Fuchū Yotsuya Bridge (Yaen Highway)
 Tokyo Prefectural Route 110 Fuchu Mitaka line Hitomi Highway, Shin-Koganei Highway
 Tokyo Prefectural Route 133 Ogawa Fuchu line Kokubunji Highway
 Tokyo Prefectural Route 229 Fuchu Chōfu line Old Kōshū Highway
 Tokyo Prefectural Route 245 Tachikawa Kokubunji Line Takikubo Dori
 Tokyo Prefectural Route 247 Fuchu Koganei line (the section in Fuchū is unopened for traffic)
 Tokyo Prefectural Route 248 Fuchu Kodaira line Shin-Koganei Highway

Local attractions

 Kyodo no mori open-air museum and park
 Tokyo Racecourse hosts numerous G1 (Grade 1) races.
 Ōkunitama Shrine
Fuchū Air Base of the Japan Air Self-Defense Force 
 Fuchu Prison, one of Japan's largest prisons

Sports
Suntory Sungoliath - a rugby team based in Fuchū
Toshiba Brave Lupus - a rugby team based in Fuchū
Fuchu Athletic F.C. - a futsal club based in Fuchū
Fuchū was part of the route used for the athletic 50 kilometer walk and marathon events at the 1964 Summer Olympics.

Notable people

Shinnosuke Furumoto, voice actor
Kazunari Hosaka, professional soccer player
Jun Ichikawa, director
Rei Igarashi, voice actress
Tomomi Kasai, idol singer
Osamu Kobayashi, anime director
Tetsuya Komuro, musician
Kuroda Kan'ichi, Marxist politician
Seiji Mizushima, anime director
Eri Kitamura, voice actress
Homare Sawa, professional women's soccer player
Taro Sekiguchi, motorcycle racer
Kunihiko Takizawa, professional soccer player
Wakatoba Hiromi, sumo wrestler
Kaidō Yasuhiro, sumo wrestler
Naoki Urasawa, manga artist

Sister city relations
  Sakuho, Nagano, Japan
  Hernals, Vienna, Austria

References

External links

Fuchū City Official Website 

 
Venues of the 1964 Summer Olympics
Olympic athletics venues
Cities in Tokyo
Western Tokyo
1954 establishments in Japan